The Calgary Chinooks were a junior "A" ice hockey team in the Alberta Junior Hockey League (AJHL) based in Calgary, Alberta, Canada.

History 
Founded in 1972 as The Pass Red Devils, the team relocated to Pincher Creek to become the Pincher Creek Panthers for the 1976–77 season. The team lasted two years in Pincher Creek before relocating again to Calgary to become the Calgary Chinooks. After one season, they were renamed the Calgary Spurs. The franchise was renamed twice more to the Calgary Royals in 1990 and the Calgary Mustangs in 2010.

Season-by-season record 
Note: GP = games played, W = wins, L = losses, T = ties, Pts = points, GF = goals for, GA = goals against

See also 
 List of ice hockey teams in Alberta

References

External links 
Alberta Junior Hockey League

Defunct Alberta Junior Hockey League teams
Defunct ice hockey teams in Alberta
Chin
Ice hockey clubs established in 1978
Ice hockey clubs disestablished in 1979
1978 establishments in Alberta
1979 disestablishments in Alberta